Kutki is a rural locality (a selo) and the administrative center of Kutkovskoye Rural Settlement, Gribanovsky District, Voronezh Oblast, Russia. The population was 470 as of 2010. There are 7 streets.

Geography 
Kutki is located 42 km southwest of Gribanovsky (the district's administrative centre) by road. Troitskoye is the nearest rural locality.

References 

Rural localities in Gribanovsky District